Darvell is a surname. Notable people with the surname include:

Bruce Darvell (1931–2005), English cricketer
Roger Darvell (1931–2014), English footballer
Sydney Darvell (1874–?), Welsh footballer

See also
Darvell Huffman (born 1967), former American football player
Darvall (surname)